Bevantolol (INN) was a drug candidate for angina and hypertension that acted as both a beta blocker and a calcium channel blocker. It was discovered and developed by Warner-Lambert but in January 1989 the company announced that it had withdrawn the New Drug Application; the company's chairman said: "Who needs the 30th beta blocker?"  it wasn't marketed in the US, UK, or Europe and the authors of a Cochrane review could find no product monograph for it.

References

Abandoned drugs
Beta blockers
Catechol ethers
O-methylated phenols
Phenoxypropanolamines